Hypocrisy Destroys Wacken is a live album released in 1999 by Swedish melodic death metal band Hypocrisy. The DVD version of the album was released in March 2001.

Track listing

Tracks 12–15 are studio recordings.

Credits

Band members
Peter Tägtgren − vocals, guitar
Mikael Hedlund − bass
Lars Szöke − drums
Mathias Kamijo − additional guitar

Production
Recorded at the Wacken Open Air, Germany, 8 August 1998
Mixed by Lars Johannson in Studio Hängballe
Photo editing by Ari Willey
Art direction by Flea Black
DVD version video cutting by Ari Williey

References

Hypocrisy (band) albums
1998 live albums
Nuclear Blast live albums